No. 7 Group of the Royal Air Force was an RAF group active in the latter part of the First World War, during the 1920s and also in the Second World War.

Organisational history

No. 7 Group was created on the day that the RAF officially came into being.  On 1 April 1918 it was created by renaming the Royal Flying Corps' Southern Training Brigade.  Initially the Group was subordinate to No. 2 Area and on 8 August the designation "Training" was added making the Group's title No. 7 (Training) Group.  With the post war reductions, the Group was disbanded on 16 Aug 1919.

The following month on 20 September 1919, No. 7 Group was reformed when South-Western Area was downgraded to group status. On 1 April 1920, the Group was transferred to Inland Area's control. The Group was disbanded for the second time on 12 April 1926.

Following the outbreak of the Second World War, the Group was reformed on 15 July 1940 as No. 7 (Operational Training) Group under Bomber Command control.  It was disestablished by its renaming to No. 92 Group RAF on 11 May 1942.  The Group's final incarnation was from 1 November 1944 to 21 December 1945.  Its function was the control of heavy conversion units.

Commanders

April 1918 to August 1919
Unknown
1 July 1919 Group Captain T C R Higgins

September 1919 to April 1926
20 September 1919 Group Captain (later Air Commodore) T C R Higgins
1 September 1922 Air Commodore L E O Charlton
1 January 1923 Air Commodore E A D Masterman
26 November 1924 Air Commodore A M Longmore
1 April 1925 Air Commodore D Le G Pitcher

July 1940 to May 1942
15 July 1940 Air Commodore The Hon R A Cochrane
2 November 1940 Air Commodore L H Cockey

November 1944 to December 1945
1 November 1944 Air Vice-Marshal G S Hodson
23 February 1945 Air Vice-Marshal E A B Rice

See also
 List of Royal Air Force groups

References

External links
Air of Authority – A History of RAF Organisation – Group No's 1 – 9

007
Military units and formations established in 1918
1918 establishments in the United Kingdom